Samantha Vidyaratna (or  K.V.Samantha Vidyaratne) is a Sri Lankan politician and a former member of the Parliament of Sri Lanka. He fought over the Uma Oya issue and the transfer of 65,000 acres of land to a Singaporean company.

Biography 

Lives in Ridimaliyadda, Badulla. He is a graduate of the University of Kelaniya. In 2004, is appointed deputy minister by President Chandrika Kumaratunga. Despite his MP position, he lived for 6 years in a house without electricity. In April 2015, he publicly criticized the Uma Oya Hydropower Complex and the heavy ecologic catastrophy it resulted in for the Uma Oya region. He is fighting against the forcible acquisition of lands in Uva Wellassa by a Singaporean company in the year 2022.

References

Year of birth missing (living people)
Living people
Members of the 13th Parliament of Sri Lanka
Janatha Vimukthi Peramuna politicians
United People's Freedom Alliance politicians